Gladys Priestley (born 17 June 1938) is a Canadian former freestyle swimmer. She competed at the 1952 Summer Olympics and the 1956 Summer Olympics.

References

External links
 

1938 births
Living people
Canadian female freestyle swimmers
Olympic swimmers of Canada
Swimmers at the 1952 Summer Olympics
Swimmers at the 1956 Summer Olympics
Swimmers from Montreal
Swimmers at the 1955 Pan American Games
Pan American Games silver medalists for Canada
Pan American Games medalists in swimming
Swimmers at the 1954 British Empire and Commonwealth Games
Swimmers at the 1958 British Empire and Commonwealth Games
Commonwealth Games medallists in swimming
Commonwealth Games silver medallists for Canada
Commonwealth Games bronze medallists for Canada
Medalists at the 1955 Pan American Games
Medallists at the 1954 British Empire and Commonwealth Games
Medallists at the 1958 British Empire and Commonwealth Games